Cai River may refer to:

Caí River, Rio Grande do Sul, Brazil
Cái River, Vietnam